The Journal of Jewish Ethics is a biannual peer-reviewed academic journal covering Jewish ethics. It is sponsored by the Society of Jewish Ethics and published by Penn State University Press. The journal was established in 2015, with Louis E. Newman (Carleton College) and Jonathan K. Crane (Emory University) as founding editors-in-chief. The current editors are Jonathan K. Crane and Emily A. Filler (Earlham College).

Abstracting and indexing
The journal is abstracted and indexed in the following bibliographic databases:
Atla Religion Database
Emerging Sources Citation Index
Scopus

See also
List of ethics journals

References

External links

 

English-language journals
Ethics journals
Biannual journals
Jewish ethics